Dieter Kindlmann (born 3 June 1982) is a German former professional tennis player. He reached his highest individual ranking on the ATP Tour on 26 July 2004, when he became World number 130. His best appearance at a Grand Slam came at the 2006 French Open, where he reached the main draw as a qualifier, losing in the second round. 

After his retirement, he served as Maria Sharapova's hitting partner. Later, he joined the coaching teams of Anastasia Pavlyuchenkova, Laura Robson, and Madison Keys, helping the American reach her first Grand Slam final in 2017. Since July 2018, he has been a head coach, accompanying Elise Mertens. On 21 November 2019, 3-time majors champion Angelique Kerber announced that she has hired Kindlmann as her coach.

Singles Titles

Grand Slam performance timeline

References

External links
 
 

1982 births
Living people
German male tennis players
German tennis coaches
People from Oberallgäu
Sportspeople from Swabia (Bavaria)
Tennis people from Bavaria